Recorder: The Marion Stokes Project is a 2019 American documentary film directed by Matt Wolf about Marion Stokes and the television news archive she created.

Summary
Stokes captured 840,000 hours of news footage over the course of 35 years, from 1977 until her death in 2012; the VHS and Betamax video recordings were donated to the Internet Archive.

The Iran hostage crisis, which lasted from 1979 to 1981, made Stokes decide to make her project a round-the-clock job due to its continuous development as it happened.

Release and reception
The film premiered at the 2019 Tribeca Film Festival and was released and distributed by Zeitgeist Films in association with Kino Lorber.

The film has  rating on Rotten Tomatoes. The site's critical consensus reads, "Recorder: The Marion Stokes Story uses one person's singular quest to illuminate the blurred line between brilliance and obsession."

See also
 InputPublic-access television talk show featured in the film, Stokes was a co-producer of the show before she started her recording project)
 Sandy Hook shootingThe last ever event recorded by Stokes, news coverage of the shooting was aired on the day she died (December 14, 2012)
 Fake news

References

External links
 
 
 Trailer
 Independent Lens
 The entire movie posted by EARTH IS A STAGE on official Vimeo channel

Biographical documentary films
2019 films
American documentary films
Documentary films about African Americans
2019 documentary films
Collage film
Collage television
Documentary films about television
2010s English-language films
2010s American films
Documentary films about women